is a national park in the Chūbu region of Japan. It was established around the Hida Mountains and encompasses parts of Nagano, Gifu, Toyama and Niigata prefectures. It was designated a national park on December 4, 1934, along with Daisetsuzan National Park, Akan National Park, Nikkō National Park, and Aso Kujū National Park.

Geography 
The Hida Mountains, or Northern Alps make up the majority of the park. There are many points in the Hida Mountains within the park that are above , including Kamikōchi,  Mount Norikura, Mount Hotaka and Mount Tate. The park is home to numerous gorges, ravines, and dramatically shaped escarpments, as well as the headwater of Japan's longest river, the Shinano River, which begins here as the Azusa River on the southeastern slope of Mount Yari.

Recreation 
The Chūbu-Sangaku National Park has become the most important hiking area in Japan. Often tourists visit the nearby mountainous highland valley, Kamikochi.

See also 
 List of national parks of Japan
 Tateyama Kurobe Alpine Route
 Japanese Alps
 Tateyama, Toyama
 Midagahara
 Murodō Station
 Kurobe Gorge
 Kurobe Gorge Railway
 Kurobe dam
 Tourism in Japan

References

External links 

 Chubusangaku National Park Southern Region Official Site

 
National parks of Japan
Hida Mountains
Parks and gardens in Nagano Prefecture
Parks and gardens in Gifu Prefecture
Parks and gardens in Niigata Prefecture
Parks and gardens in Toyama Prefecture
Protected areas established in 1934
1934 establishments in Japan
Japan Alps